Preston Manor is a mixed all-through school within the London Borough of Brent, located in the Preston and Wembley Park areas. It educates primary and secondary school-age children and adults and has a sixth form.

History

Grammar school
It was founded in 1938 as Preston Manor County Grammar School and its first headteacher was Mr W.P. Bannister. He remained headmaster until his death in 1963. It provided a traditional grammar school curriculum with science and languages streams. The school motto was "Munus prae jure" which may be translated as "Duty before right".

Comprehensive
It became a Technology College in 1993.

Preston Manor as a Science College
Preston Manor was amongst the first cohort of schools nationally to become a specialist Science College in 2002 with Mathematics as an additional specialism.

It has four local primary partner schools in the borough that it works with throughout the year as part of its specialist science community work.

Academy
The school converted to academy status in February 2013.

Expansion
As of September 2008 Preston Manor began admitting forty more students into its cohort. To facilitate this the school needed to expand. Work began in January 2008 on a £4.5 million project which will see a new teaching block and a 4 court sports hall built, amongst other new facilities.

Notable former pupils
 Darren Currie – footballer with a number of professional and non-League clubs in England
 Michelle Griffith – triple jumper
 Junior Lewis – footballer and coach with a number of professional and non-League clubs in England
 Una Padel (1956–2006) – criminal justice reformer, known for her work in penal reform
 Lady Sovereign – musician (expelled)
 Kapil Trivedi – drummer for the British Indie Group Mystery Jets
 Rémi Gaillard – French comedian from Montpellier
 Moeed Majeed – Podcast producer and presenter
 Ahir Shah - Comedian 
 Bahram Keshtmand – Afghan athlete and nephew of former Afghan politician Sultan Ali Keshtmand.

Preston Manor County Grammar School
 Bob Blackman – Conservative MP since 2010 for Harrow East
 Simon Bond, author of 101 Uses for a Dead Cat
 Barbara Bray née Jacobs, distinguished scholar of French literature and a well-known literary translator, partner of Samuel Beckett
 Mike Ellis (athlete), hammer thrower who competed in the Rome 1960 Summer Olympics, and won gold for England at the 1958 British Empire and Commonwealth Games in Cardiff
 Mark Goodfellow, Ambassador to Gabon from 1986 to 1990
 Prof Raymond Gosling, worked with the DNA team at King's College London in the early 1950s, and took the infamous Photo 51 in May 1952, that enabled Watson and Crick to deduce the structure of DNA was a double helix
 John Hosier CBE – Head of schools music broadcasts at the BBC from 1960 to 1973 and Principal of the Guildhall School of Music and Drama from 1978 to 1989
 Andrew Pryce Jackman, keyboardist in The Syn who arranged the Peter Skellern song "You're a Lady", and whose father Bill Jackman played the clarinet on When I'm Sixty-Four, and his son is the film composer Henry Jackman, notably for Big Hero 6
 Vivian Liff, known for The Record of Singing
 Jim Slater, private investor who started Slater Walker in the 1960s, and the Really Essential Financial Statistics (REFS) company financial information system in 1994, and who wrote The Zulu Principle
 Jeffrey Sterling, Baron Sterling of Plaistow CBE, Chairman from 1983 to 2005 of the Peninsular and Oriental Steam Navigation Company (P&O), owns the Swan Hellenic cruise line, and founded Motability in 1977
 Rosemary Thew, Chief Executive from 2005 to 2013 of the Driving Standards Agency, who arranged its merger with VOSA
 Mari Wilson, singer

Notable teachers 

 Colin Hegarty, creator of HegartyMaths

References

External links
 Preston Manor High School Site
 Ofsted Inspection Report 2005

Video clips
 The Prime Minister visits Preston Manor High School

Primary schools in the London Borough of Brent
Secondary schools in the London Borough of Brent
Educational institutions established in 1938
1938 establishments in England
Academies in the London Borough of Brent
Wembley
Specialist science colleges in England